Yinztagram is a free photography mobile app for iOS that allows users to superimpose images of Pittsburgh landmarks in photos.  The name "Yinztagram" is a portmanteau of yinz, a term from Pittsburghese, and Instagram, a popular photo application.  The most recent version 1.2 was released on September 15, 2012.  

The Pittsburgh landmarks available in the program include Rick Sebak, Dippy, and Primanti Brothers sandwiches.  As part of the celebration of Rick Sebak's 25th year WQED, the PBS station worked with the owners of at Yinztagram to expand the offerings of Rick Sebak photos.  The programmers are always taking requests for new landmarks.

The creator of the program, Matthew Pegula, is a programmer for Deeplocal, a Sharpsburg creative technology agency; he is a self-proclaimed "distant relative" of multibillionaire Terry Pegula.  Pegula began the project after his friend Drew Von Arx made jokes about Instagram and the possibility of adding Pittsburgh landmarks.

Mackenzie Carpenter of the Pittsburgh Post-Gazette, describing the examples of Rick Sebak appearing in Yinztagram photos.

References

Image-sharing websites
Yinz
Companies based in Pittsburgh
American social networking websites